Emma Williams may refer to:
Emma Williams (actress) (born 1983), British actress who starred in The Parole Officer
Emma Williams (gymnast) (born 1983), British gymnast who competed at the 2000 Summer Olympics
Emma Clarissa Williams (1874–1952), American church leader, clubwoman and activist
Emma Vyssotsky (1894–1975), née Williams, American astronomer
Emma Kennedy (Elizabeth Emma Williams, born 1967), British comedian
Emma "Emm" Williams, a character in Cow (Only Stwpd Cowz Txt N Drive)
Emma Williams, a character from The Grudge, portrayed by Grace Zabriskie